The Scarlet Bazaar (French: La kermesse rouge) is a 1947 French historical drama film directed by Paul Mesnier and starring Albert Préjean, Andrée Servilanges and Jean Tissier.

It was shot at the Buttes-Chaumont Studios in Paris. The film's sets were designed by the art director Marcel Magniez.

The film portrays the fictional rivalry between two painters, a man and wife, that concludes with an incident based on a real-life 1897 fire in Paris.

Main cast
 Albert Préjean as Claude Sironi  
 Andrée Servilanges as Agnès Bonnardet-Sironi  
 Jean Tissier as René de Montbriant  
 Germaine Kerjean as Mme Bonnardet  
 Lucas Gridoux as L'antiquaire  
 Émile Drain as Le révérend dominicain  
 Léon Arvel as M. Bonnardet  
 Hélène Tossy as Tante Élisabeth  
 Marthe Mellot as Rose de St-Aubin  
 Nina Myral as Éléonore de St-Aubin  
 Marcelle Rexiane  as La gouvernante  
 Colette Régis as La duchesse d'Alençon

References

Bibliography 
 Burnett, Colin. The Invention of Robert Bresson: The Auteur and His Market. Indiana University Press, 2016.

External links 
 

1947 films
1940s French-language films
Films directed by Paul Mesnier
1940s historical drama films
French historical drama films
Films set in Paris
French black-and-white films
1947 drama films
1940s French films